SM UC-51 was a German Type UC II minelaying submarine or U-boat in the German Imperial Navy during World War I. The U-boat was ordered on 20 November 1915 and was launched on 5 December 1916. She was commissioned into the German Imperial Navy on 6 January 1917 as SM UC-51. In seven patrols UC-51 was credited with sinking 28 ships, either by torpedo or by mines laid. UC-51 was mined and sunk in the English Channel on 17 November 1917.

The wreck was located and identified by marine archaeologist Innes McCartney close to the official sinking position in 2001.

Design
A German Type UC II submarine, UC-51 had a displacement of  when at the surface and  while submerged. The submarine was powered by two six-cylinder four-stroke diesel engines each producing  (a total of ), two electric motors producing , and two propeller shafts.

UC-51 was fitted with six  mine tubes, eighteen UC 200 mines, three  torpedo tubes (one on the stern and two on the bow), seven torpedoes, and one  Uk L/30 deck gun. Her complement was twenty-six crew members.

Summary of raiding history

References

Notes

Citations

Bibliography

 
 

Ships built in Kiel
German Type UC II submarines
U-boats commissioned in 1917
U-boats sunk by mines
Maritime incidents in 1917
U-boats sunk in 1917
World War I minelayers of Germany
World War I shipwrecks in the English Channel
World War I submarines of Germany
1916 ships
Ships lost with all hands